Nauta is an urban center in the Peruvian Amazon.

Nauta may refer to:

The Latin word for sailor
Nauta District, Loreto, Peru

Surname

Dieuwke de Graaff-Nauta (1930–2008), Dutch politician
Isaac Nauta (born 1997), American football player
Kate Nauta (born 1982), American model and actress
 (born 1966), Dutch historian and winner of the 2016 Spinoza Prize
Max Nauta (1896–1957), Dutch painter
Sarah Nauta (born 1998), Dutch singer and voice actress
Walle Nauta (1916–1994), Dutch and American neuroanatomist
Yvonne Nauta (born 1991), Dutch speed skater

See also
 
 Nautan, Bihar, India

Dutch-language surnames
Occupational surnames